Aethes languidana is a species of moth of the family Tortricidae. It was described by Josef Johann Mann in 1855. It is found in France, Spain, Portugal and Italy and on Corsica and Sardinia.

Adults are on wing in March and from May to July.

The larvae feed on Helichrysum (including Helichrysum arenarium) and Phagnalon species.

References

languidana
Moths described in 1855
Moths of Europe
Taxa named by Josef Johann Mann